The St. Augustine Amphitheatre (shortened as The Amp) is an outdoor amphitheater located on  A1A in St. Augustine, Florida, United States. The venue seats over 4,000 persons, and is managed by the St. Johns County Parks & Recreation department.

History
The amphitheatre was built in 1965 to commemorate the 400th anniversary of the founding of St. Augustine, originally with 2,000 seats. land was originally part of Anastasia State Park. The amphitheatre itself was constructed in one of the old coquina quarries used to supply building materials for St. Augustine and the Castillo de San Marcos.

The Pulitzer Prize winning playwright Paul Green was commissioned to write a play to be performed at the amphitheatre. The result was Cross and Sword: A Symphonic Drama of the Spanish Settlement of Florida, a musical reenactment of the first years of St. Augustine's existence. Cross and Sword was designated the official state play in 1973 by the Florida Legislature. The play ran until 1996, when budget constraints ended its more than 30-year run.

The amphitheatre was used infrequently during the following years, though it did host a free summer Shakespeare Festival from 1997 to 2003. In 2002, St. Johns County acquired the property and the following year began an $8.7 million renovation. The upgraded facility reopened in August 2007, which includes a fiberglass tensile canopy over the main stage.  It now has 4,092 seats. In 2019, the theater branded itself as "The Amp". Also in 2019, the Amp is ranked #2 amphitheatre in the United States and #3 worldwide according to leading concert-industry publication Pollstar Magazine's 2019 Mid-Year report.

Noted performers

Duran Duran
311
Alan Jackson
Aretha Franklin
The Avett Brothers
Awolnation
Barenaked Ladies
Billy Currington
The Black Crowes
Bob Dylan
Boston
Chris Stapleton
Evanescence
Goo Goo Dolls
Jason Isbell
Kendrick Lamar
The Lumineers
Matchbox Twenty
The Monkees
O.A.R.
The Smashing Pumpkins
Shawn Mendes
Weezer
Widespread Panic
ZZ Top
Vampire Weekend
Bastille
Old Dominion
Rick Springfield
Steve Miller Band
Foster the People
AJR
Foreigner
The Marshall Tucker Band
Willie Nelson
Jack Johnson
Slayer
John Legend
Weezer
Earth, Wind & Fire
Lettuce
Kansas
The Doobie Brothers
Cyndi Lauper
38 Special
Styx
Robert Plant
Daryl Hall & John Oates
Heart
Two Door Cinema Club
"Weird Al" Yankovic
Paramore
Twenty One Pilots
Lynyrd Skynyrd
Bad Company
Joe Cocker
Don Felder
Sammy Hagar & The Circle
Robert Plant
Ted Nugent
The Sonics
John Fogerty
Fabulous Thunderbirds
Brian Wilson
MC5

Photos

References

Amphitheaters in the United States
Theatres completed in 1965
Music venues in Florida
Buildings and structures in St. Augustine, Florida
Theatres in Florida
Tourist attractions in St. Augustine, Florida
1965 establishments in Florida